The 1982 Stanford Cardinal baseball team represented Stanford University in the 1982 NCAA Division I baseball season. The Cardinal played their home games at Sunken Diamond. The team was coached by Mark Marquess in his 6th year at Stanford.

The Cardinal won the Pacific-10 Conference Playoff and the West I Regional to advanced to the College World Series, where they were defeated by the Maine.

Roster

Schedule 

! style="" | Regular Season
|- valign="top" 

|- align="center" bgcolor="#ccffcc"
| 1 || January 29 ||  || Sunken Diamond • Stanford, California || 6–1 || 1–0 || –
|- align="center" bgcolor="#ccffcc"
| 2 || January 30 || San Francisco || Sunken Diamond • Stanford, California || 7–6 || 2–0 || –
|- align="center" bgcolor="#ccffcc"
| 3 || January 30 || San Francisco || Sunken Diamond • Stanford, California || 3–0 || 3–0 || –
|-

|- align="center" bgcolor="#ccffcc"
| 4 || February 2 ||  || Sunken Diamond • Stanford, California || 8–0 || 4–0 || –
|- align="center" bgcolor="#ccffcc"
| 5 || February 5 || Cal State Fullerton || Sunken Diamond • Stanford, California || 2–0 || 5–0 || –
|- align="center" bgcolor="#ffcccc"
| 6 || February 6 || Cal State Fullerton || Sunken Diamond • Stanford, California || 3–10 || 5–1 || –
|- align="center" bgcolor="#ccffcc"
| 7 || February 6 || Cal State Fullerton || Sunken Diamond • Stanford, California || 5–4 || 6–1 || –
|- align="center" bgcolor="#ccffcc"
| 8 || February 7 ||  || Sunken Diamond • Stanford, California || 8–0 || 7–1 || –
|- align="center" bgcolor="#ccffcc"
| 9 || February 10 ||  || Sunken Diamond • Stanford, California || 7–1 || 8–1 || –
|- align="center" bgcolor="#ccffcc"
| 10 || February 12 ||  || Sunken Diamond • Stanford, California || 8–0 || 9–1 || –
|- align="center" bgcolor="#ccffcc"
| 11 || February 14 || San Jose State || Sunken Diamond • Stanford, California || 7–4 || 10–1 || –
|- align="center" bgcolor="#fffdd0"
| 12 || February 18 ||  || Sunken Diamond • Stanford, California || 2–2 || 10–1–1 || –
|- align="center" bgcolor="#ccffcc"
| 13 || February 19 ||  || Sunken Diamond • Stanford, California || 5–2 || 11–1–1 || –
|- align="center" bgcolor="#ccffcc"
| 14 || February 20 ||  || Sunken Diamond • Stanford, California || 4–2 || 12–1–1 || –
|- align="center" bgcolor="#ccffcc"
| 15 || February 20 || Pepperdine || Sunken Diamond • Stanford, California || 3–2 || 13–1–1 || –
|- align="center" bgcolor="#ccffcc"
| 16 || February 22 || at San Jose State || San Jose Municipal Stadium • San Jose, California || 15–3 || 14–1–1 || –
|- align="center" bgcolor="#ccffcc"
| 17 || February 26 ||  || Sunken Diamond • Stanford, California || 6–2 || 15–1–1 || 1–0
|- align="center" bgcolor="#ffcccc"
| 18 || February 27 || at California || Evans Diamond • Berkeley, California || 1–2 || 15–2–1 || 1–1
|- align="center" bgcolor="#ccffcc"
| 19 || February 28 || California ||  Sunken Diamond • Stanford, California || 9–1 || 16–2–1 || 2–1
|-

|- align="center" bgcolor="#ccffcc"
| 20 || March 3 || Santa Clara || Sunken Diamond • Stanford, California || 2–1 || 17–2–1 || 2–1
|- align="center" bgcolor="#ccffcc"
| 21 || March 5 || at  || Dedeaux Field • Los Angeles, California || 12–7 || 18–2–1 || 3–1
|- align="center" bgcolor="#ccffcc"
| 22 || March 6 || at Southern California || Dedeaux Field • Los Angeles, California || 11–5 || 19–2–1 || 4–1
|- align="center" bgcolor="#ccffcc"
| 23 || March 7 || at Southern California || Dedeaux Field • Los Angeles, California || 11–4 || 20–2–1 || 5–1
|- align="center" bgcolor="#ccffcc"
| 24 || March 9 ||  || Sunken Diamond • Stanford, California || 10–8 || 21–2–1 || 5–1
|- align="center" bgcolor="#ccffcc"
| 25 || March 12 ||  || Sunken Diamond • Stanford, California || 2–1 || 22–2–1 || 6–1
|- align="center" bgcolor="#ccffcc"
| 26 || March 13 || Arizona || Sunken Diamond • Stanford, California || 10–7 || 23–2–1 || 7–1
|- align="center" bgcolor="#ccffcc"
| 27 || March 13 || Arizona || Sunken Diamond • Stanford, California || 9–5 || 24–2–1 || 8–1
|- align="center" bgcolor="#ccffcc"
| 28 || March 20 || at  || Jackie Robinson Stadium • Los Angeles, California || 11–5 || 25–2–1 || 9–1
|- align="center" bgcolor="#ffcccc"
| 29 || March 20 || at UCLA || Jackie Robinson Stadium • Los Angeles, California || 5–7 || 25–3–1 || 9–2
|- align="center" bgcolor="#ccffcc"
| 30 || March 21 || at UCLA || Jackie Robinson Stadium • Los Angeles, California || 11–8 || 26–3–1 || 10–2
|- align="center" bgcolor="#ccffcc"
| 31 || March 22 || at  || Unknown • Riverside, California || 7–4 || 27–3–1 || 10–2
|- align="center" bgcolor="#ccffcc"
| 32 || March 22 || vs  || Unknown • Riverside, California || 22–1 || 28–3–1 || 10–2
|- align="center" bgcolor="#ccffcc"
| 33 || March 23 || vs  || Unknown • Riverside, California || 3–1 || 29–3–1 || 10–2
|- align="center" bgcolor="#ffcccc"
| 34 || March 23 || vs  || Unknown • Riverside, California || 4–5 || 29–4–1 || 10–2
|- align="center" bgcolor="#ffcccc"
| 35 || March 26 || vs  || Unknown • Riverside, California || 4–7 || 29–5–1 || 10–2
|- align="center" bgcolor="#ffcccc"
| 36 || March 26 || vs  || Unknown • Riverside, California || 2–4 || 29–6–1 || 10–2
|- align="center" bgcolor="#ffcccc"
| 37 || March 27 || vs  || Unknown • Riverside, California || 2–3 || 29–7–1 || 10–2
|-

|- align="center" bgcolor="#ffcccc"
| 38 || April 2 || at  || Packard Stadium • Tempe, Arizona || 4–15 || 29–8–1 || 10–3
|- align="center" bgcolor="#ffcccc"
| 39 || April 3 || at Arizona State || Packard Stadium • Tempe, Arizona || 7–8 || 29–9–1 || 10–4
|- align="center" bgcolor="#ffcccc"
| 40 || April 4 || at Arizona State || Packard Stadium • Tempe, Arizona || 5–19 || 29–10–1 || 10–5
|- align="center" bgcolor="#ffcccc"
| 41 || April 5 || at Arizona || Jerry Kindall Field at Frank Sancet Stadium • Tucson, Arizona || 4–7 || 29–11–1 || 10–6
|- align="center" bgcolor="#ccffcc"
| 42 || April 6 || at Arizona || Jerry Kindall Field at Frank Sancet Stadium • Tucson, Arizona || 19–7 || 30–11–1 || 11–6
|- align="center" bgcolor="#ffcccc"
| 43 || April 7 || at Arizona || Jerry Kindall Field at Frank Sancet Stadium • Tucson, Arizona || 2–4 || 30–12–1 || 11–7
|- align="center" bgcolor="#ccffcc"
| 44 || April 12 || San Jose State || Sunken Diamond • Stanford, California || 2–0 || 31–12–1 || 11–7
|- align="center" bgcolor="#ccffcc"
| 45 || April 13 || at Santa Clara || Buck Shaw Stadium • Santa Clara, California || 8–2 || 32–12–1 || 11–7
|- align="center" bgcolor="#ffcccc"
| 46 || April 17 || UCLA || Sunken Diamond • Stanford, California || 3–4 || 32–13–1 || 11–8
|- align="center" bgcolor="#ccffcc"
| 47 || April 17 || UCLA || Sunken Diamond • Stanford, California || 9–3 || 33–13–1 || 12–8
|- align="center" bgcolor="#ccffcc"
| 48 || April 18 || UCLA || Sunken Diamond • Stanford, California || 16–5 || 34–13–1 || 13–8
|- align="center" bgcolor="#ccffcc"
| 49 || April 19 || Arizona State || Sunken Diamond • Stanford, California || 8–0 || 35–13–1 || 14–8
|- align="center" bgcolor="#ffcccc"
| 50 || April 20 || Arizona State || Sunken Diamond • Stanford, California || 7–12 || 35–14–1 || 14–9
|- align="center" bgcolor="#ffcccc"
| 51 || April 21 || Arizona State || Sunken Diamond • Stanford, California || 3–15 || 35–15–1 || 14–10
|- align="center" bgcolor="#ffcccc"
| 52 || April 27 || at Fresno State || Varsity Park • Fresno, California || 3–6 || 35–16–1 || 14–10
|- align="center" bgcolor="#ccffcc"
| 53 || April 30 || Southern California || Sunken Diamond • Stanford, California || 9–3 || 36–16–1 || 15–10
|-

|- align="center" bgcolor="#ccffcc"
| 54 || May 1 || Southern California || Sunken Diamond • Stanford, California || 12–5 || 37–16–1 || 16–10
|- align="center" bgcolor="#ccffcc"
| 55 || May 2 || Southern California || Sunken Diamond • Stanford, California || 6–5 || 38–16–1 || 17–10
|- align="center" bgcolor="#ccffcc"
| 56 || May 4 || at Santa Clara || Buck Shaw Stadium • Santa Clara, California || 13–6 || 39–16–1 || 17–10
|- align="center" bgcolor="#ccffcc"
| 57 || May 6 || at  || Unknown • Rohnert Park, California || 15–6 || 40–16–1 || 17–10
|- align="center" bgcolor="#ccffcc"
| 58 || May 14 || at California || Evans Diamond • Berkeley, California || 7–5 || 41–16–1 || 18–10
|- align="center" bgcolor="#ccffcc"
| 59 || May 15 || California || Sunken Diamond • Stanford, California || 8–5 || 42–16–1 || 19–10
|- align="center" bgcolor="#ccffcc"
| 60 || May 16 || at California || Evans Diamond • Berkeley, California || 9–3 || 43–16–1 || 20–10
|-

|-
|-
! style="" | Postseason
|- valign="top"

|- align="center" bgcolor="#ccffcc"
| 61 || May 18 ||  || Sunken Diamond • Stanford, California || 15–6 || 44–16–1 || 20–10
|- align="center" bgcolor="#ccffcc"
| 62 || May 19 || Oregon State || Sunken Diamond • Stanford, California || 15–4 || 45–16–1 || 20–10
|-

|- align="center" bgcolor="#ccffcc"
| 63 || May 27 ||  || Sunken Diamond • Stanford, California || 10–5 || 46–16–1 || 20–10
|- align="center" bgcolor="#ccffcc"
| 64 || May 28 || Fresno State || Sunken Diamond • Stanford, California || 17–10 || 47–16–1 || 20–10
|- align="center" bgcolor="#ccffcc"
| 65 || May 29 || Pepperdine || Sunken Diamond • Stanford, California || 15–8 || 48–16–1 || 20–10
|-

|- align="center" bgcolor="#ccffcc"
| 66 || June 5 || vs  || Johnny Rosenblatt Stadium • Omaha, Nebraska || 15–4 || 49–16–1 || 20–10
|- align="center" bgcolor="#ccffcc"
| 67 || June 8 || vs Texas || Johnny Rosenblatt Stadium • Omaha, Nebraska || 6–8 || 49–17–1 || 20–10
|- align="center" bgcolor="#ffcccc"
| 68 || June 9 || vs Maine || Johnny Rosenblatt Stadium • Omaha, Nebraska || 5–8 || 49–18–1 || 20–10
|-

Awards and honors 
Mike Aldrete
 Third Team All-American Baseball America

Bob DeCosta
 First Team All-Pac-10

Mike Dotterer
 First Team All-Pac-10
 Second Team All-American Baseball America

Eric Hardgrave
 Second Team All-American Baseball America

Bob Hausladen
 First Team All-Pac-10

Brian Mignano
 First Team All-Pac-10

References 

Stanford Cardinal baseball seasons
Stanford Cardinal baseball
College World Series seasons
Stanford